The Gaan River is a river in the United States territory of Guam.

See also
List of rivers of Guam

References

Rivers of Guam